Bhanodra is a village located in Choryasi Taluka of Surat district in Gujarat state of India. It is about 15km from the Arabian Sea coast and less than 4km from Surat City Municipal Boundary. Its nearest railhead is Bhestan, Surat City about 4km from the village.  Bhandora has a population of about 500 people, the vast majority being Sunni Surati Vohra and a small number of Tribal Hindus. Most of the families are engaged in agriculture. The village is often counted within the larger settlement of  Eklera.

References

Villages in Surat district